Matthew Evan Williams (born July 25, 1959) is a former professional baseball pitcher. He pitched parts of two seasons in Major League Baseball: 1983 for the Toronto Blue Jays and 1985 for the Texas Rangers.

Williams was the Blue Jays' first-round pick in the 1981 Major League Baseball Draft and the fifth pick overall out of Rice University. He debuted for the Blue Jays in 1983, but pitched just 8 innings in 4 games before returning to the minor leagues. After another two years in the minors, Williams was traded to the Rangers as part of a deal to acquire Cliff Johnson. Williams pitched six games down the stretch for Texas, including three starts, with an ERA of 2.42. Despite this impressive showing, he never again played in the major leagues.

References

1959 births
Living people
American expatriate baseball players in Canada
Baseball players from Texas
Florence Blue Jays players
Knoxville Blue Jays players
Major League Baseball pitchers
Oklahoma City 89ers players
Rice Owls baseball players
Syracuse Chiefs players
Toronto Blue Jays players
Texas Rangers players